WCTX (channel 59) is a television station licensed to New Haven, Connecticut, United States, serving the Hartford–New Haven market as an affiliate of MyNetworkTV. It is owned by Nexstar Media Group alongside ABC affiliate WTNH (channel 8), also licensed to New Haven. Both stations share studios on Elm Street in downtown New Haven; per a channel sharing agreement, the stations transmit using WTNH's spectrum from a tower in Hamden, Connecticut.

History
As early as 1953, a construction permit for the analog UHF channel 59 allotment was issued by the Federal Communications Commission (FCC) and was originally owned by the Connecticut Radio Foundation. However, the group was never able to get the station on-the-air and sold the permit to Impart Systems in 1967. In 1971, the then-owner of NBC affiliate WHNB-TV (channel 30, now WVIT) in New Britain built a low-power translator on UHF channel 59 in New Haven (W59AA licensed to West Haven). Although WHNB had boosted its power to cover New Haven a few months earlier, some areas in Southern Connecticut still could not get a good signal from the station.

On April 3, 1995, the station finally began broadcasting as a WB affiliate with the callsign WTVU under a local marketing agreement (LMA) with LIN TV, owner of WTNH. Before WTVU's sign on, The WB's programming had been shown on WTNH following its late newscast on Saturday nights (The WB only offered two hours a week of programming at that point); viewers living in Southwestern Connecticut were able to view the network's programs in-pattern via New York City-based superstation WPIX.

Under the terms of the LMA, WTNH bought WTVU's entire broadcast day, giving the station a lineup of strong syndicated programs, mostly barter shows and second runs from WTNH. It also ran classic sitcoms and drama shows such as Hawaii Five-O, Perry Mason, M*A*S*H, I Love Lucy, Happy Days, The Honeymooners, The Andy Griffith Show, The Beverly Hillbillies, I Dream of Jeannie, Bewitched and Gilligan's Island among others that were removed from the schedules of WTXX (channel 20, now WCCT-TV) and WTWS (channel 26, now Ion Television affiliate WHPX-TV) some years back. It also picked up the over-the-air rights to Hartford Whalers hockey games, which aired on the station until the team became the Carolina Hurricanes in 1997.

On April 1, 1996, the station changed its call letters to WBNE (for "WB New England"). After Tribune Broadcasting (a minority owner of The WB) purchased then-UPN affiliate WTXX, WBNE and that station swapped network affiliations on January 1, 2001. With the new network relationship came the current WCTX calls and use of the on-air identity "The X". That identity was used in lieu of the conventional "UPN (channel number)" branding. LIN TV purchased WCTX outright in 2002. On September 19, 2005, WCTX became known as "UPN 9" (the same branding as fellow New York affiliate WWOR-TV), highlighting its cable channel position in some areas.

On January 24, 2006, CBS Corporation and the Warner Bros. Entertainment unit of Time Warner announced that UPN and The WB would cease broadcasting and merge their programming inventories to create a new network called The CW. WTXX was chosen as Connecticut's CW affiliate after its owner Tribune announced a ten-year deal with the upcoming network leaving WCTX to tentatively become an independent station once again. However, on April 26, WCTX announced it would join MyNetworkTV (a second new network launched by News Corporation).

MyNetworkTV began broadcasting on September 5, and as a result, the station did not carry the final two weeks of UPN programming. With its new network affiliation, the station changed its branding to the current "MyTV9". As of the 2007–2008 season, University of Connecticut men's basketball games now air primarily on WCTX while a handful of games air on sister station WTNH. It recently signed a multi-year television deal with the WNBA's Connecticut Sun to broadcast select regular season games as well.

Until March 31, 2008, WCTX served as the default MyNetworkTV affiliate on Charter Communications cable systems for the Springfield–Holyoke, Massachusetts market as that area did not have an affiliate of its own. On that date, ABC affiliate WGGB-TV added the network as a secondary affiliation on its new Fox-affiliated second digital subchannel. WCTX is still seen on Charter. WCTX was also repeated on W11BJ (now WFXQ-CD) from a transmitter on Rattlesnake Mountain in Farmington from 2004 until 2006 while LIN TV built a new transmitter for that channel and moved its city of license to Springfield.

On March 21, 2014, Media General announced that it would purchase LIN Media and its stations, including WTNH and WCTX, in a $1.6 billion merger. The merger was completed on December 19.

On September 8, 2015, Media General announced that it would acquire the Meredith Corporation for $2.4 billion, with the combined group to be renamed Meredith Media General once the sale is finalized. Because Meredith already owns WFSB, and the two stations rank among the four highest-rated stations in the Hartford–New Haven market in total day viewership, the companies would have been required to sell either WFSB or WTNH to comply with FCC ownership rules as well as recent changes to those rules regarding same-market television stations that restrict sharing agreements; WCTX would have been the only one of the three stations affected by the merger that could be legally be acquired by Meredith Media General, as its total day viewership ranks below the top-four ratings threshold. However, on January 27, 2016, Nexstar Broadcasting Group announced that it had reached an agreement to acquire Media General, resulting in the termination of Meredith's acquisition by Media General.

On December 3, 2018, Nexstar announced it would acquire the assets of Chicago-based Tribune Media—which has owned Fox affiliate WTIC-TV (channel 61) since 1996 and CW affiliate WCCT-TV (channel 20) since 2001—for $6.4 billion in cash and debt. Nexstar was required to sell two of the stations (including one ranking in the top four in ratings) to a separate, unrelated company to comply with FCC ownership rules. On March 20, 2019, it was announced that Nexstar would keep the WTNH/WCTX duopoly and sell the WTIC/WCCT duopoly to McLean, Virginia-based Tegna Inc. as part of the company's sale of nineteen Nexstar- and Tribune-operated stations to Tegna and the E. W. Scripps Company in separate deals worth $1.32 billion; this would make the WTIC/WCCT duopoly the first television properties in Connecticut and southern New England for Tegna.

Programming
In addition to the MyNetworkTV schedule, syndicated programming on WCTX includes TMZ on TV, Family Feud, Judge Judy, Rachael Ray, and Extra, among others. WCTX is also a secondary ABC affiliate, airing that network's programs when WTNH is unable to do so due to extended breaking news coverage or a local special.

WCTX formerly carried Boston Red Sox games syndicated from the "Fox 25 Red Sox Television Network".

Newscasts
Since the start of the local marketing agreement with WCTX in 2000, WTNH has been producing a nightly prime time newscast at 10 p.m. on channel 59. It has competed right from its April 17, 2000 debut with WTIC-TV's 10 p.m. broadcast, which established itself as the leading prime time newscast in the market since it debuted in 1989. As of the February 2008 ratings period, WTIC's weeknight newscast was the most watched late evening news broadcast in the market, even gathering more viewership than the 11 p.m. newscasts on Connecticut's Big Three stations.

In 2005, WCTX began simulcasting the second hour of WTNH's weekday morning show (at 6 a.m.), followed by a third hour from 7 to 8 a.m. that is seen exclusively on WCTX, except for simulcast Good Morning America cut-ins on WTNH. The second hour was eventually dropped for an unknown reason. The 7 a.m. hour received competition on March 3, 2008 when WTIC launched its own weekday morning newscast. On April 26, 2010, WTNH rebranded from News Channel 8 to News 8. In addition, WTNH began broadcasting its local newscasts in 16:9 widescreen enhanced definition, with WCTX's newscasts being included in the upgrade. On October 4, 2010, WTNH became the third station in the market to begin broadcasting its newscasts in high definition; WCTX's newscasts also made the transition. On March 30, 2020, WTNH planned to launch an expansion of WCTX's prime time newscast to the three-hour entirety of prime time on weeknights and 90 minutes on weekends, presumably pushing back MyNetworkTV programming to the graveyard slot in late night, an increasingly common fate for the service. This quickly shifted to launching on March 16 instead to provide continuing coverage of the local impact of the COVID-19 pandemic.

Technical information

Subchannels
The station's digital signal is multiplexed:

Until TheCoolTV was added on WCTX-DT2 in 2010 (which was subsequently dropped on July 15, 2013), the subchannel aired a 24-hour live feed of WTNH's regional weather radar called the "SkyMax Doppler Network". Justice Network aired on WCTX-DT3 from February 2016 until March 2018, when WTIC-TV added it on its DT4 subchannel. WCTX additionally carries live sports events of local interest from Sinclair's Stadium.

Analog-to-digital conversion
WCTX shut down its analog signal, over UHF channel 59, on June 12, 2009, as part of the federally mandated transition from analog to digital television. The station's digital signal remained on its pre-transition UHF channel 39, using PSIP to display WCTX's virtual channel as 59 on digital television receivers, which was among the high band UHF channels (52-69) that were removed from broadcasting use as a result of the transition.  In 2018, WCTX moved its digital signal to VHF Channel 10, which it now shares with sister station WTNH.

See also
Channel 9 branded TV stations in the United States
Channel 39 digital TV stations in the United States
Channel 59 virtual TV stations in the United States

References

External links
 

MyNetworkTV affiliates
Grit (TV network) affiliates
True Crime Network affiliates
Television channels and stations established in 1995
1995 establishments in Connecticut
CTX
Nexstar Media Group
National Hockey League over-the-air television broadcasters
Companies based in New Haven, Connecticut